Acacia nigricans is a species of wattle  which is endemic to an area on the south coast of Western Australia.

Description
It produces yellow, globular flowers between mid-winter and late spring.

Taxonomy
The species was formally described in 1807 by French naturalist Jacques Labillardière who gave it the name Mimosa nigricans, based on plant material collected from Esperance. It was transferred to the genus Acacia in 1813 by botanist Robert Brown.

Distribution
It is often situated on coastal sand dunes, on granite hills and among rocks growing in grey or white sandy soils along the south coast of Western Australia in the Goldfields-Esperance regions.

See also
List of Acacia species

References

nigricans
Acacias of Western Australia
Fabales of Australia
Plants described in 1813
Taxa named by Robert Brown (botanist, born 1773)
Taxa named by Jacques Labillardière